Okeover is a civil parish in the district of East Staffordshire, Staffordshire, England. It contains 26 buildings that are recorded in the National Heritage List for England. Of these, nine are listed at Grade II*, the middle grade, and the others are at Grade II, the lowest grade. The major buildings in the parish are Okeover Hall and the nearby church. Both are listed, as are many structures in the grounds of the hall. The other listed buildings include houses, cottages, farmhouses and farm buildings, a former water mill, and a bridge.


Key

Buildings

References

Citations

Sources

Lists of listed buildings in Staffordshire
Borough of East Staffordshire